Babor is a town and commune in Sétif Province in petite Kabylie in north-eastern Algeria.

References

Communes of Sétif Province